Bybe parmenoides is a species of beetle in the family Cerambycidae, and the only species in the genus Bybe. It was described by Pascoe in 1866.

References

Apomecynini
Beetles described in 1866
Monotypic Cerambycidae genera